Altinópolis is a Brazilian municipality in the state of São Paulo. The population is 16,203 (2020 est.) in an area of 929 km². The city is known for its sights, like the Praça das Esculturas, and its wide variety of caves and waterfalls.

Tourism 
Altinópolis has five rivers and 35 waterfalls. One of them is 72 meters high.

There are eight caves regularly visited by tourist, highlighted by the Itambé Cave with a façade of 28 meters and some 350 meters of galleries. The Department of Tourism gives visitors the necessary information and support. The ranking of the city was high in the last Hall of São Paulo Tourism.

For those interested in art, there are the works of Vaccarini Bassano (1914 - 2002).

Bassano Vaccarini sculpture park 
 
He was born in Milan, Italy and arrived in Brazil after World War II and chose Altinópolis for his workshop in 1980. The sculpture park opened in 1992.

Besides being a professor of Visual Arts at FAU-USP (São Paulo) and Unaerp (in Ribeirao Preto, where he lived), it was a costume designer, set designer, director of the Brazilian Comedy Theater.

Folia de Reis Festival 

Every February there is a gathering of traditional groups that keep alive the dance and singing to the grace of the three wise eastern kings . The festival itself is one of the few traditional religious meetings, and carries the unique elements of this regional expression. 
The festivity is held in front of the city's cathedral, usually in the second week of February.

References

External links 

  Official City Website

Municipalities in São Paulo (state)